The Life of Beethoven (German: Das Leben des Beethoven) is a 1927 Austrian silent drama film directed by Hans Otto and starring Fritz Kortner, Heinz Altringen and Ernst Baumeister.

Cast
 Fritz Kortner as Ludwig van Beethoven 
 Heinz Altringen
 Ernst Baumeister
 Dely Drexler
 Lilian Gray
 Willy Schmieder

References

Bibliography 
 Jeongwon Joe & Sander L. Gilman. Wagner and Cinema. Indiana University Press, 2010.

External links 
 

1927 films
1920s biographical drama films
1920s historical films
Austrian biographical drama films
Austrian historical films
Austrian silent feature films
Films directed by Hans Otto
Films set in the 19th century
Depictions of Ludwig van Beethoven on film
Austrian black-and-white films
1927 drama films
Films set in the Austrian Empire
Silent drama films